In geometry, the great grand 120-cell or great grand polydodecahedron is a regular star 4-polytope with Schläfli symbol {5,5/2,3}. It is one of 10 regular Schläfli-Hess polytopes.

Related polytopes 

It has the same edge arrangement as the small stellated 120-cell.

See also 
 List of regular polytopes
 Convex regular 4-polytope
 Kepler-Poinsot polyhedron – regular star polyhedron
 Star polygon – regular star polygons

External links 
 Regular polychora 
 Discussion on names
 Reguläre Polytope
 The Regular Star Polychora

References 
 Edmund Hess, (1883) Einleitung in die Lehre von der Kugelteilung mit besonderer Berücksichtigung ihrer Anwendung auf die Theorie der Gleichflächigen und der gleicheckigen Polyeder .
H. S. M. Coxeter, Regular Polytopes, 3rd. ed., Dover Publications, 1973. .
 John H. Conway, Heidi Burgiel, Chaim Goodman-Strass, The Symmetries of Things 2008,  (Chapter 26, Regular Star-polytopes, pp. 404–408)
 

4-polytopes